Marie Bethell Beauclerc (10 October 1845 – 19 September 1897) was a pioneer in the teaching of Pitman's shorthand and typing in Birmingham, England. In 1888 she was the first woman to be appointed as a teacher in an English boys' public school, at Rugby School. The Phonetic Journal, September 1891 and the journal, Birmingham Faces And Places, September 1892, both credit her with being the first female reporter in England.

Early life
Marie Bethell Beauclerc was born in London in 1845 as Maria Bethell. When she was around four years old, she and her older twin siblings Richard and Elizabeth, were sent from London to a boarding school near Bath. By this time Maria Bethell's surname and the surname of her siblings, had been changed to Beauclerc. The children's father, Richard Bethell, died when Maria was five years old. The reason for the name change of Maria, Richard and Elizabeth from Bethell to Beauclerc, however, is unknown. Maria Beauclerc attended Weston Boarding Schools near Bath until circumstances forced her to leave School at the age of nine. When aged twelve, she began teaching herself shorthand from a manual which she found in some waste paper. The manual entitled The Phonographic Teacher, was written by Isaac Pitman (knighted in 1894). On her thirteenth birthday, Maria Beauclerc and her mother moved to Birmingham where she continued her studies through a member of the Phonetic Society in Bath who corrected her exercises through the post. The addition of Bethell to the name Beauclerc appeared for the first time in the title of a biography entitled  Marie Bethell Beauclerc in The Phonetic Journal Sept. 1891.

Reporter
In 1863, at the age of eighteen, Maria Beauclerc was engaged for two months as shorthand amanuensis to a phrenological lecturer visiting Birmingham. Later George Dawson (1821–1876), editor of the Birmingham Morning News between 1871 and 1873, also engaged Maria Beauclerc because of her outstanding shorthand reporting skills. The appointment of a female reporter by the Birmingham Morning News was extraordinary as it was the first time in England that a female had been engaged by a newspaper as a shorthand reporter. Maria Beauclerc became professionally known as Marie Beauclerc and her work at the Birmingham Morning News included the reporting of many public meetings, conferences and lectures. At this time, shorthand was still a male dominated expertise however from approximately 1865 until Dawson's sudden death in 1876, Marie Beauclerc also recorded most of the content of the nine volumes of Dawson's lectures, prayers and sermons. Four volumes were published after Dawson's death. George St. Clair, the editor of these volumes, acknowledges in the prefaces that "The discourses are mostly from the shorthand reports of Miss Marie Beauclerc." A similar preface reads, "When a lecture is reported by Miss Beauclerc – as is the case with the one on the Shadow of Death  – we have a near approach to fulness and accuracy". Further on St. Clair adds, "I have had, as before, the invaluable help of Miss Beauclerc in collating and transcribing." Marie Beauclerc is also credited in prefaces of volumes of work by author and preacher Christopher J. Street (1855–1931). When Unitarian clergyman and lecturer, Robert Collyer (1823–1912), visited Birmingham from the United States, he engaged Marie Beauclerc to report and edit his sermons and prayers which were delivered at Newhall Hill Church Birmingham on 2 September, 1883 and published during the same year.

Teacher
In 1874 the Perry Barr Institute, the first suburban institute in Birmingham was established and Marie Beauclerc was appointed a teacher of phonography. She held her position at this institute for fourteen years until 1888. Marie Beauclerc was also engaged in teaching phonography when it was introduced at the Birmingham and Midland Institute in 1876. "Thousands of pupils have passed through the hands of Miss Beauclerc, in connection with this institute alone; and many young men owe their start in life to the knowledge they have thus gained". "In 1888, Miss Beauclerc was accorded the high honour of the appointment of Teacher of Shorthand at Rugby School". This was the first time shorthand had been taught in an English public school and the first appointment of a female teacher in an English boys' public school. There were one hundred boys in her classes and Dr. Percival, headmaster at this time "expressed his satisfaction at the excellence of the teaching and the progress made by the pupils". Beauclerc also taught senior boys at the Birmingham Blue Coat School and in addition to achieving as a female teacher of predominately male students in the fields of shorthand and typing, Beauclerc was a teacher of dancing and callisthenics.

Pioneer

In 1887, Marie Beauclerc established a Shorthand Writers Association and "officially introduced the art of typewriting to Birmingham". Also in 1887, Beauclerc delivered a paper at the International Shorthand Congress and Phonographic Jubilee in London. Her paper, entitled Phonography in Birmingham, illustrates her passion for her pioneering work and is contained in the printed Transactions of the Congress held by the Pitman Library at the University of Bath. In England at this time, shorthand and typing were still male domains with few places available for female students and few employment opportunities for females. Marie Beauclerc's pioneering work in the fields of shorthand and typing, benefited the progress of Birmingham's business and cultural community, while her example and the discussion she generated, (e.g. International Congress) helped pave the way for the explosion of female stenography in the 20th century. In 1892, Beauclerc now known as Marie Bethell Beauclerc, retired from teaching at the Birmingham and Midland Institute. Her retirement was due to illness, however, she continued to edit Sunday Evening Lectures by James C. Street "during her short intervals of ease".

Death

Marie Bethell Beauclerc died on 19 September, 1897. She is buried at Key Hill Cemetery, Birmingham, two plots away from George Dawson. A quote from her headstone reads:

Commemoration 
A Birmingham Civic Society blue plaque in commemoration of Beauclerc's achievements in Birmingham was unveiled in the Library of Birmingham on 9 October, 2020.

Notes

References
 Beauclerc, Marie, 1887 : Phonography in Birmingham : Transactions of the Congress – Pitman Library – University of Bath
Birmingham Daily Post, Tues. 22 September, 1891- Newspaper article - Birmingham and Midland Institute School of Commerce 
Birmingham Daily Post, Wed. 12 October, 1887 - Newspaper article - Birmingham and Midland Institute Shorthand Writers' Association     
Birmingham Daily Post, Tues. 22 September, 1891 - Newspaper article - Midland Institute Shorthand Department
Birmingham Daily Post, Wed. 10 August, 1892 - Newspaper article - Retirement of Miss Beauclerc
Birmingham Faces And Places  – May 1893, Volume 5, pp. 70,74, J.G. Hammond, Journal – Birmingham Public Library
Dawson, George, 1888 : Every-Day Counsels : Kegan Paul, Trench and Co; 1 Paternoster Square, London – Preface
Dawson George, 1888 : Shakespeare and Other Lectures : Kegan Paul, Trench and Co. 1 Paternoster Square, London – Preface
Evening Despatch Birmingham 27 May, 1949 – Newspaper article – First woman reporter
Key Hill Cemetery – Burial plot: I:961 – Gravestone: In memory of Marie Bethell Beauclerc  – erected by Church of the Saviour founded and built 1847–95 Birmingham
Maria Bethell – Birth certificate – 10 October, 1845, St. Pancras Lond. England
Maria Bethell Beauclerc – Death Certificate – 19 September, 1897 Birmingham England
Obituary – Birmingham Post – 23 September, 1897 – Miss Marie Beauclerc
The Phonetic Journal September 1891 – pp. 596–597 – Our Portrait Gallery- Marie Bethell Beauclerc – Pitman Library, University of Bath
UK censuses- 1851, 1861, 1871, 1881,1891
Empson, Richard : The Friends of Key Hill and Warstone Lane Cemeteries, Chairman – Correspondence, 24 September, 2009

Further reading
Blain, Helen, 2009 : Marie Bethell Beauclerc – (1845–1897) Good Scholar – Holistic Teacher – Courageous Woman : The Friends of Key Hill and Warstone Lane Cemeteries Newsletter, no.16. (November 2009)
Wilson, Wright, 1905 :  The Life of George Dawson, M.A. Glasgow  : Percival Jones Ltd. Birmingham

External links
Transcription of The Phonetic Journal – Our Portrait Gallery – Marie Bethell Beauclerc pp. 596
Transcription of The Phonetic Journal – Our Portrait Gallery – Marie Bethell Beauclerc pp. 556
The Friends of Key Hill and Warstone Lane Cemeteries Christmas Card from Marie Bethell Beauclerc
https://www.youtube.com/watch?v=kk0E9jE58OQ  Blue Plaque Unveiling 9 October, 2020
https://www.youtube.com/channel/UCeROdYjUOvlRdUbtheMEdDw/videos?view=0  Tribute to Marie Bethell Beauclerc with speeches personally read by Helen Blain and Sue Beauclerc, great-grandnieces of Marie Bethell Beauclerc. These speeches were read at the unveiling of the Blue PLaque to Marie Bethell Beauclerc by members of the Birmingham Civic Society on 9 October, 2020.
https://www.youtube.com/channel/UCeROdYjUOvlRdUbtheMEdDw/videos?view=0  "Maria's Story" A fictional story for children and read by children about Marie Bethell Beauclerc, written by Helen Blain Great-Grandniece of Marie Bethell Beauclerc. 
https://www.tamarindcreativegraphics.com/Marie_Beauclerc.pdf "A Remarkable Victorian Woman - Marie Beauclerc" A story of determination during the Victorian era of rigid gender and class prejudice by Helen Blain Great-Grandniece of Marie Bethell Beauclerc 2013 
Two Sermons Collyer, Robert (1823–1912)
Communings with the Father viii Preface- "the whole of the contents of the present volume are from the excellent shorthand reports of Miss Beauclerc."  Street, Christopher J. (1855–1931)
The Phonographic Teacher

Schoolteachers from the West Midlands
English reporters and correspondents
British women journalists
19th-century British journalists
19th-century British women writers
19th-century British writers
1845 births
1897 deaths
People from St Pancras, London
Burials at Key Hill Cemetery
19th-century women journalists